Jacques Degats (20 February 1930 – 29 March 2015) was a French athlete who competed in the 1952 Summer Olympics and in the 1956 Summer Olympics.

References

1930 births
2015 deaths
French male sprinters
Olympic athletes of France
Athletes (track and field) at the 1952 Summer Olympics
Athletes (track and field) at the 1956 Summer Olympics
European Athletics Championships medalists
Athletes (track and field) at the 1951 Mediterranean Games
Athletes (track and field) at the 1955 Mediterranean Games
Mediterranean Games gold medalists for France
Mediterranean Games medalists in athletics